Wawrzyniec Karol de Teisseyre (1860–1939) was a Polish geologist who is known for his work on the southern part of the Trans European Suture Zone and Galician and Romanian geology.

Wawrzyniec Teisseyre was born in Cracow (Poland) of French ancestry. He studied at the University of Vienna and the Mining Academy in Leoben (Austria) and worked at the institutes of geology in Vienna and Bucharest. As part of his work on the Geological Atlas of Galicia, he mapped the southern part of the Trans European Suture Zone (Teisseyre-Tornquist Zone) and associated features of the Carpathian Mountains. During his time in Bucharest he investigated oil deposits of Romania.

See also 
 Teisseyre-Tornquist Zone

References 

20th-century Polish geologists
1860 births
1939 deaths
19th-century Polish geologists